Rimšė is a town in the Ignalina district municipality, Utena County, Lithuania, center of the Rimšė Eldership.

References

External links
 Virtual Tour of Rimšė

Towns in Lithuania
Towns in Utena County
Ignalina District Municipality
Novoalexandrovsky Uyezd
Wilno Voivodeship (1926–1939)